Drakarna över Helsingfors (Kites over Helsingfors) is a Swedish-language novel written by Finnish author Kjell Westö. The book tells about the life and faiths of the Bexar family, a Swedish-speaking Finnish family living in Helsinki (Helsingfors in Swedish), from the 1960s to the 1990s.

In 2001, the novel was made into a film of the same name starring Pirkka-Pekka Petelius.

Other titles 
 Leijat Helsingin yllä (Finnish translation)

References

External links
Drakarna över Helsingfors

1996 novels
20th-century Finnish novels
Novels set in Helsinki
Finnish novels adapted into films
Swedish-language novels